German submarine U-1196 was a Type VIIC U-boat of Nazi Germany's Kriegsmarine during World War II.

She was ordered on 25 August 1941, and was laid down on 8 February 1943 at F Schichau GmbH, Danzig, as yard number 1566. She was launched on 2 September 1943 and commissioned under the command of Oberleutnant zur See Wilhelm Brand on 18 November 1943.

Design
German Type VIIC submarines were preceded by the shorter Type VIIB submarines. U-1196 had a displacement of  when at the surface and  while submerged. She had two shafts and two  propellers.

U-1196 was fitted with five  torpedo tubes (four fitted at the bow and one at the stern), fourteen torpedoes or 26 TMA mines, one  SK C/35 naval gun, (220 rounds), one  Flak M42 and two twin  C/30 anti-aircraft guns. The boat had a complement of between 44 — 52 men.

Service history
U-1196 was scuttled at Travemünde on 2 May 1945 as part of Operation Regenbogen. Her wreck was raised and broken up.

References

Bibliography

External links

German Type VIIC submarines
U-boats commissioned in 1943
World War II submarines of Germany
Ships built in Danzig
1943 ships
Operation Regenbogen (U-boat)
Ships built by Schichau
Maritime incidents in May 1945